The Eternal Mother, a Burmese drama film created by Sin Yaw Mg Mg is based on the true story novel, "Mother and I", by Dr. Khin Maung Win. This is the first cooperated film between Sin Yaw Mg Mg and May Than Nu who did not work together since their separation 12 years ago. Their son, Min Thant Mg Mg, work as a deputy director for this film. This film was aired in Singapore.

Plot
Khin Maung Win is the son of a police officer. After his father retires from the police department, they moved to their home town, Wundwin. His mother, Daw Khin Khin, worked hard so that her children could go to school.  Among her children, only Khin Mg Win passed the matriculation exam with three distinctions, and later he attended the University of Medicine, Mandalay. He then met with Khin Lay Yee. Not long after he became a professor, his mother died.

Cast

Main
Nay Toe as Khin Maung Win
Wutt Hmone Shwe Yi as Khin Lay Yi (spouse of Khin Maung Win)
May Than Nu as Daw Khin Khin (Mother of Khin Maung Win)
Ye Aung as Khin Maung Win's father

Supporting
Htun Ko Ko as Khin Maung Win's deputy
Zin Aung as Khin Maung Win's elder brother

Shooting locations

Myanmar
Mandalay
Yangon
Wundwin
Pyin Oo Lwin

Singapore
Singapore

England
London

Awards and nominations

References 

2017 films